Spadina is a subway station on Line 1 Yonge–University and Line 2 Bloor–Danforth in Toronto, Ontario, Canada. It is located on Spadina Road, north of Bloor Street West. It is one of only two stations open overnight, along with Union station. Wi-Fi service is available at this station.

The station consists of two separate sections, one for each line, at the same level and 150 metres apart. The north–south platforms, which opened in 1978, were originally planned as a separate station, but the TTC decided to join to the existing 1966 east–west station with a pedestrian tunnel containing a pair of long moving walkways. The cost of the moving walkways themselves became an issue when they became due for refurbishment or replacement, and they were shut down and ultimately removed in 2004, leaving the corridor as a simple underground walkway. The former location of the moving walkways remains visible because the tiles used to cover their removal are noticeably different. Warnings to hold the handrails are still embossed on the walls where the ends of the moving walkways were once located.

An underground loop for the 510 Spadina streetcar was added in 1997 near the east end of the east–west platforms. The streetcar platform adds Postmodern finishes to the station's mix of styles. These range from the basic Modernist tiles of the Bloor–Danforth line platform, to the more intricate round tiles and backlit signage of the Yonge–University line platform.

In 1997, this station became accessible only to the Bloor–Danforth platforms and exit.

Architecture and art

Spadina and Bloor 
The largest above ground structure is the bus station; its main entrance, along with elevators and a fare collector booth, is located on the east side of Spadina Road just north of Bloor Street, which currently serves as the terminus of the 127 Davenport bus route. Originally, it was built to serve as a looping facility for the former 77 Spadina bus which operated until the underground streetcar loop was added and the buses were replaced by 510 Spadina streetcars. This building, with its pseudo-mansard roof and brick arches and no obvious bold signage like most other station entrances, is located at the easterly end of the Bloor line platforms. There is a secondary entrance building directly opposite, on the west side of Spadina Road, which is only accessible to those with Presto cards.

At the street level, there are three large cedar wood carvings called K'san Village House Posts depicting an owl, a wolf and a hawk. They are the work of Fedelia O'Brien, Murphy Green and Chuck Heit respectively, who are from the Gitxsan First Nation in British Columbia.

Walmer Road 

There is an automatic entrance, accessible only to Presto card holders as of November 2017, on the east side of Walmer Road. It leads to the west end of the Bloor line platforms.

Norman B. Gash House 

The main entrance to the Yonge–University line part of the station is concealed inside a house at 85 Spadina Road, which was built in 1899 and listed as a heritage property by the City of Toronto in 1974. The building was designed by architect Robert Ogilvie for lawyer Norman Gash. The property had previously been needed for construction of the Spadina Expressway, which was cancelled in 1971. Since it was still planned to build the subway on its original route along the course of the expressway, the site was subsequently acquired by Metropolitan Toronto in 1972, with the intention of replacing it with a new station building. Local protest forced the TTC to repurpose the old building, thereby retaining the residential character of the neighbourhood. Opposite the house, on the west side of Spadina Road at Kendal Avenue, there is an uncovered stairwell entrance to the station mezzanine. There are northbound and southbound bus stops outside the entrances. This entrance only accepts Presto cards.

This building includes two large artworks: Morning Glory by Louis de Niverville, a surreal enamel mural sited on the ground level by the stairwell; and Barren Ground Caribou by Joyce Wieland, a huge quilt featuring caribou in a tundra landscape, located near the unmanned turnstile on the concourse level below.

Subway infrastructure in the vicinity
This section of the Bloor line was constructed by cut and cover on a strip of land behind the properties fronting on the north side of Bloor Street. The tracks run east from here to the lower level of St. George station. Between the stations connecting tracks from the Bloor line rise on each side to the upper level of St. George station, like exit ramps on a highway, providing a link with the University line.

The section of the Yonge–University line at and between Dupont and Spadina stations was constructed under Spadina Road. South of the station the tunnel turns off-street and curves eastward through 90 degrees to run briefly parallel to Bloor Street before entering the upper level of St. George station.

Nearby landmarks
The station is located in The Annex neighbourhood at the northwest corner of the University of Toronto main campus. Destinations and nearby points of interest include the Spadina Road Branch of the Toronto Public Library, Native Canadian Centre of Toronto, Miles Nadal Jewish Community Centre, Bloor Street United Church, and Trinity-St. Paul's United Church.

Surface connections

When the subway is closed, streetcars still enter the station. TTC routes serving the station include:

References

External links

Line 1 Yonge–University stations
Line 2 Bloor–Danforth stations
Toronto streetcar loops
Railway stations in Canada opened in 1966